Norman Martin Johnson  (born July 29, 1938) is an American politician of the Republican Party. He was a member of the Washington House of Representatives, representing the 14th district.

Awards 
 2014 Guardians of Small Business award. Presented by NFIB.

References

1941 births
Living people
Republican Party members of the Washington House of Representatives
21st-century American politicians